Nationality words link to articles with information on the nation's poetry or literature (for instance, Irish or France).

Events
 Klemens Janicki is appointed poeta laureatus by the Pope
 Lazare de Baif travels with Pierre de Ronsard (both eventually French poets) to Alsace, where they meet many northern humanists.

Awards

Works published
 Sir Thomas More, Lady Fortune, publication year uncertain
 Girolamo Schola, publication year uncertain, Italian poems on various subjects, including hats, gypsies, geese, horses, mustard caps and sausages
  Tontada Siddhesavara, Shatsthala Jnanamrita

Births
Death years link to the corresponding "[year] in poetry" article:
 January 26 – Florent Chrestien (died 1596), French satirist and Latin poet
 June 11 – Barnabe Googe (died 1594), English
 Pierre de Bourdeille, seigneur de Brantôme, born about this year (died 1614), French soldier, historian, biographer and poet
 Francisco de Terrazas, born about this year  (died c. 1600), Mexican
 Rhys Cain (died 1614), Welsh language poet
 Frei Agostinho da Cruz (died 1619), brother of Diogo Bernardes, Portuguese
 Mathias Holtzwart born about this year (died sometime after 1589), German
 Jacob Regnart born sometime from this year to 1545 (died 1599), Flemish composer

Deaths
Birth years link to the corresponding "[year] in poetry" article:
 October 5 – Helius Eobanus Hessus (born 1488, German, Latin poet

See also

 Poetry
 16th century in poetry
 16th century in literature
 Dutch Renaissance and Golden Age literature
 French Renaissance literature
 Renaissance literature
 Spanish Renaissance literature

Notes

16th-century poetry
Poetry